Eden is a 1976 play by American playwright Steve Carter. Set in the 1920s, it is the first of Carter's Caribbean trilogy. Eden explores intra-racial conflicts between recent immigrants from the Caribbean and the African-American population.  The West Coast premiere of this critically acclaimed play received five Los Angeles Drama Critics Circle Awards.

Characters
 Joseph Barton The main character of the play. A recent Caribbean immigrant to the United States and follower of Marcus Garvey.
 Annetta Barton Joseph's daughter.  She falls in love with Eustace Baylor, an African-American from the South, which causes the central conflict within the story.
 Eustace Baylor An African American from the rural South than falls in love with Annette.
 Solomon Barton One of Joseph's sons.
 Nimrod Barton One of Joseph's sons.

Plot synopsis
Set in the San Juan Hill section of New York City in 1927, Joseph Barton, a recent Caribbean immigrant and follower of Marcus Garvey discovers to his horror that his daughter is keeping company with an uneducated African American man from the rural South.

Origins of the play
Eden is loosely based on the story of the playwright's parents. Horace Carter, Sr., a native of Virginia, and his wife, Carmen, who was born in New York of Caribbean descent, lived in New York City at the time of their son's birth.

Original off-Broadway production
Directed by Edmund Cambridge
Produced by Negro Ensemble Company (NEC)
Executive Director: Robert Hooks
Artistic Director: Douglas Turner Ward
Managing Director: Frederick Garrett
Set Designer: Pamela S. Peniston
Costume Designer: Edna Watson
Lighting Designer: Sandra L. Ross
Production Stage Manager: Clinton Turner Davis
Opened: March 3, 1976 at St. Mark's Playhouse (transferred to Theatre De Lys on May 14, 1976)

Cast
 Graham Brown - Joseph Barton
 Shirley Brown — Annetta Barton
 Barbara Montgomery - Aunt Lizzie
 Ethel Ayler - Florie
 Samm-Art Williams - Eustace Baylor
 Laurence Fishburne - Solomon Barton
 Nate Farrell — Nimrod Barton
 Ramona King — Agnes

Replacements
 James Warden, Jr. - Solomon Barton,

Los Angeles production (West Coast premiere)

Directed by Edmund Cambridge
Produced by Los Angeles Actors Theatre
Opened: December 2002 at Los Angeles Actors Theatre

Cast
 Carl Lumbly - Joseph Barton
 Cheryl Francis - Annetta Barton
 Harold Sylvester - Eustace Baylor
 Marilyn Coleman
 Ralph Carter
 J Marshall Evans  
 Larry B. Scott

Feature film project
In 1985, Carter wrote the screenplay A Time Called Eden, based on his play. It was set to go into production the following year, however, to date, the project remains unproduced.

Awards and nominations

Awards
 1976 Outer Critics Circle Award
 1976 Audelco Award
 1980 Los Angeles Drama Critics Circle Award - Direction (Edmund Cambridge)
 1980 Los Angeles Drama Critics Circle Award - Lead Performance (Carl Lumbly)
 1980 Los Angeles Drama Critics Circle Award - Playwrighting (steve carter)
 1980 Los Angeles Drama Critics Circle Award - Production (Los Angeles Theatre Center)
 1980 Los Angeles Drama Critics Circle Award - Supporting Performance (Marilyn Coleman)

Notes
In 2008, Barbara Montgomery from the original cast, staged a reading of Eden with the Negro Ensemble Company as part of The NEC Classic Playreading Series.

References

External links
 

1976 plays
Plays by Steve Carter (playwright)
African-American plays
Plays set in New York City
Fiction set in 1927